The influence of Edgar Allan Poe on the art of music has been considerable and long-standing, with the works, life and image of the horror fiction writer and poet inspiring composers and musicians from diverse genres for more than a century.

Classical music

In 1907, American composer Grace Chadbourne set Poe's text to music with her "Hymn for Solo Voice: At Morn, at Noon, at Twilight Dim."

André Caplet's Conte fantastique for harp and strings, published in 1924 but begun at least as early as 1909, is a musical retelling of "The Masque of the Red Death".

In 1913, Sergei Rachmaninoff set his choral symphony The Bells to a Russian translation of Poe's poem of the same name.

The American conductor and composer Leonard Slatkin composed a setting of The Raven for narrator and symphony orchestra in 1971. A lesser-known American composer, Edgar Stillman Kelley (1857–1944) wrote a piece for orchestra entitled The Pit and the Pendulum.

The American composer Philip Glass wrote the 1978 The Fall of the House of Usher to a libretto by Arthur Yorinks.

The Russian composer Nikita Koshkin wrote the 1984 piece Usher Valse (Usher Waltz) for solo guitar, depicting Usher's frenzied guitar performance in the short story "The Fall of the House of Usher". The Usher Waltz has been recorded by John Williams and Elena Papandreou.

The American composer James Poulsen composed "Five Poems of Edgar Allan Poe" for medium high voice and piano in 1986. The song cycle was orchestrated in 1998 with a commission from Jack and Dawn Taylor of Des Moines, Iowa. The Des Moines Symphony premiered the work in 1999 with Robin Roewe, tenor. The poems in the set are: 'Alone', 'Evening Star', Hymn', 'A Dream', and 'To One in Paradise.' Poulsen has also set a letter of Poe, a letter of Maria Clemm, and the valentine poem of Virginia Poe to music.

The Finnish composer Einojuhani Rautavaara based his 1997 choral fantasy "On the Last Frontier" on the final two paragraphs of Poe's novel The Narrative of Arthur Gordon Pym of Nantucket.

Other operas based on stories by Poe are Ligeia, a 1994 opera by Augusta Read Thomas, and The Tell-Tale Heart by Bruce Adolphe. A ballet based on a story by Poe is Hop-Frog, a 2009 ballet by Terry Brown.

The American composer Dominick Argento wrote an opera, based on the death of Poe.

Leon Botstein, conductor of the American Symphony Orchestra—which presented a program of "Tales From Edgar Allan Poe" in 1999—noted that in the realm of classical music, as in literature, Poe's influence was felt more deeply in Europe than in America.

The American composer Emma Lou Diemer set "A Dream Within A Dream" and "Eldorado" for mixed chorus and piano. These works were published by Hinshaw Music, Inc. in 2001. Daron Hagen included settings of "A Dream Within a Dream" and "Thou Wouldst Be Loved" in the 1983 song cycle "Echo's Songs", published by E.C. Schirmer. Leonard Bernstein set "Israfel" as part of his song cycle for voices and orchestra, Songfest.

Greek composer Dionysis Boukouvalas set Poe's sonnet To Zante to music in 2001. Zante (or Zakynthos) is Boukouvalas's native island. After a revision of the work in 2012, it was premiered at the very same island with the composer at the piano, sung by soprano Andriana Lykouresi.

The British and American composer Tarik O'Regan uses portions of Poe's poem Israfel as the basis of his 2006 composition The Ecstasies Above for voices and string quartet.

The American composer Christopher Rouse based his 2011 symphonic poem Prospero's Rooms on the castle of Prince Prospero in "The Masque of the Red Death."

The American conductor and composer Adam Stern wrote a setting of Poe's early poem "Spirits of the Dead", subtitled "rhapsody for narrator and orchestra." The work received its world premiere in Seattle in October, 2014. Edmund Stone was the narrator, and the composer led the Seattle Philharmonic Orchestra.

American composer Daniel Steven Crafts Gothic Hauntings, for tenor and orchestra, setting Annabel Lee and Dream-Land   Recorded by tenor Brian Cheney.

Classically trained American organist/composer/vocalist Kristen Lawrence created a musical setting to mirror Poe's rhythm and mood for the 18 verses of "The Raven" in her 2012 album, Edgar Allan Poe's "The Raven."   This music was used during the National Endowment for the Arts THE BIG READ: Shades of Poe in San Diego and Burbank, California, during events designed to encourage and inspire the community through stories, music, authors, art, poetry, film, actors and dance to read the works of Edgar Allan Poe.

In 2018, American composer/violinist Edward W. Hardy composed three pieces inspired by Edgar Allan Poe: "Nevermore" for solo violin, "Evil Eye" for string quartet and "A Fantasy" for string quartet. "Nevermore" was inspired by The Raven, "Evil Eye" inspired by "The Tale-Tell Heart" and "A Fantasy" inspired by The Masque of the Red Death.

Popular music

Pop music
 Frankie Laine recorded a version of Annabel Lee in 1957, which was adapted from Poe's poem by Vic Corpora and Albert Lerner.
 When the Beatles compiled images for the cover of Sgt. Pepper's Lonely Hearts Club Band in 1967, one of the most recognizable faces was that of Poe, in the center of the top row. In the same year, John Lennon wrote his famous nonsensical work "I Am the Walrus", which contained the lines, "Elementary penguin singing Hari Krishna/Man, you should have seen them kicking Edgar Allan Poe."
In 1985 synth-pop band Propaganda (ZTT label, Trevor Horn, Steve Lipson) used Poe’s poem ‘A Dream Within A Dream’ for the 1st track on their debut album ‘A Secret Wish’ with the same songtitle as Poe’s poem itself. The poem is used as spoken word text (by Propaganda’s Suzanne Freytag) on top of the majesticly composed track.
 Pop singer Britney Spears named her 2001-2002 concert tour the Dream Within a Dream Tour, incorporating lines from that poem (and other Poe works) into her show.
 Chamber pop band Antony and the Johnsons released a three-track EP titled The Lake in 2004 via Secretly Canadian Records. The eponymous title track is a musical rendition of Poe's poem of the same name.
 Scarlet's Well's fifth album Black Tulip Wings (2006) features musical settings of "To One In Paradise" and "Evening Star".
 Hikaru Utada wrote her 2014 song "Kremlin Dusk" about Poe's poem "The Raven".
 In 2017, French pop/celtic singer Nolwenn Leroy has set Poe's poems "A Dream" and "The Lake" to music, released on her album Gemme.
 In the Eurovision Song Contest 2023, Poe is referenced heavily in the lyrics of Austria's song "Who the Hell Is Edgar?" by duo Teya and Salena.

Folk, country, and blues
 The American folk and protest singer Phil Ochs set Poe's poem "The Bells" to music on his 1964 debut album, All the News That's Fit to Sing.
 The American folk group "the 3 D's" recorded a version of "Annabel Lee" in 1964 and included it on their New Dimensions in Folk Songs album.
 Bob Dylan's 1965 song "Just Like Tom Thumb's Blues" makes reference to "Rue Morgue Avenue".
 Poe's final poem "Annabel Lee" was set to music by composer Don Dilworth, and was recorded by Joan Baez as part of her 1967 album Joan, as well as by Spanish pop band Radio Futura.
 The blues/rock band, The Yardbirds, adapted The second stanza (and a portion of the first) of Poe's "Dream within a Dream" to music.
 The Irish singer-songwriter Fionn Regan, in his song, "Lord Helpy My Poor Soul", sings the lines "Lord help my poor soul, I'm down like Edgar Poe".

Rock, punk, and alternative
 In 1974, English glam rock band Queen recorded the song "Nevermore" based on "The Raven" for their second album Queen II. The song appears on the Black Side of the vinyl (side 2, entirely written by Freddie Mercury).
 In 1974 British band Ross released an album on RSO Records based on The Pit & The Pendulum. The lyrics of the closing track Oh, I'm Happy Now are an extract of the poem Bridal Ballad.
 In 1976, the British art rock group the Alan Parsons Project released a full album, Tales of Mystery and Imagination, based on Poe's stories and poems. Opening with an instrumental named for Poe's poem "A Dream Within a Dream", the album features songs based on "The Raven", "The Cask of Amontillado", "The System of Doctor Tarr and Professor Fether" (which was a Top 40 hit) and "To One in Paradise", as well as a five-part rock symphony called "The Fall of the House of Usher". Producer and engineer Alan Parsons released a remixed version of the album in 1987, featuring narration by Orson Welles; executive producer Eric Woolfson revisited the concept in a 2003 stage musical [Poe: More Tales of Mystery and Imagination].Also, in their 1980 album The Turn of a Friendly Card, there is an instrumental song called "The Gold Bug".
 The American rock band The Smithereens released a song called "William Wilson", based on the Poe story of the same name, on their 1989 album 11.
 American ska punk band the Cherry Poppin' Daddies released a song called "Teenage Brainsurgeon" which referenced A Descent into the Maelström and The Imp of the Perverse among other works of horror on their 1990 album Ferociously Stoned.
 Peter Hammill of Van der Graaf Generator released an operatic version of "The Fall of the House of Usher" in 1991. A remixed and re-recorded version was released in 1999.
 Blues Traveler featured the lyrics, "Once upon a midnight dreary", (from "The Raven") in their 1994 hit "Run-Around".
 Québécois artist Jean Leloup has a song "Edgar" depicting, in a somewhat humorous way, the last times of Edgar Allan Poe, on his landmark album Le Dôme (1996).
 Pop-punk band then known as A New Found Glory featured a song named "Tell-Tale Heart" on their 1999 album Nothing Gold Can Stay.
 The post-hardcore band Thrice has a song "The Red Death" on their album The Illusion of Safety (2002) which in style and plot refers to the short story "The Masque of the Red Death".
 Five Iron Frenzy's song "That's How The Story Ends" has several quotes from "The Raven" incorporated into it. It was released on their album The End Is Near (2003).
 Poe is mentioned in the song "St. Jimmy" by Green Day on the album American Idiot (2004). The lyric says, "I am the son of a bitch and Edgar Allan Poe, raised in the city in the halo of lights."
 The electronic alternative rock solo music project Latent Anxiety by Ilja Rosendahl based the song Red Death from the album Sensation (2007) upon Poe's "The Masque of the Red Death".
 The White Stripes, a garage rock duo from Detroit, reference Poe's short story, "The Masque of the Red Death", with their single titled "Red Death at 6:14".
 Swedish neo-glam rock band The Ark's album Prayer for the Weekend′s fourth track, "Little Disfunk You," claims the singer will be the "Murder in the Rue Morgue you're trying to solve," among other auspicious roles, including "mother" and "savior," that he hopes to play for the song's apparently emotionally repressed and sexually confused target.
 The post-hardcore band Chiodos cites Poe as one of their inspirations for lyrics from their third CD, entitled Bone Pallace Ballet.
 Italian rocknoir band Belladonna regards Poe as their main inspiration and have included a line from Ligeia in the booklet of their debut album, entitled Metaphysical Attraction.
 The Argentinian band Soda Stereo made a song called "Corazón Delator" from Poe's short story "The Tell-Tale Heart".
 The band Glass Wave included a song on their 2010 album entitled Annabel Lee, in reference to Poe's last complete poem.
 The album Dying Is Your Latest Fashion by Escape the Fate makes many references to Poe's short stories, specifically in the song "When I Go Out I Want to Go Out in a Chariot of Fire" the singer, Ronnie Radke, says "your heart beats under the floor" in reference to Poe's short story "The Tell-Tale Heart".
 The video for the Thirty Seconds to Mars song "Hurricane" ends with the lines from Poe's poem "Raven": "Deep into that darkness peering, long I stood there wondering, fearing, doubting, dreaming dreams no mortal ever dared to dream before".
 In 2010, American Rock band Black Rebel Motorcycle Club recorded "Annabel Lee" as a Bonus track for their album Beat The Devil's Tattoo.
 In late 2010, German Krautrock group Tangerine Dream recorded an album titled The Island of the Fay, which was released via online shops on March 18, 2011. The album was recorded by Edgar Froese and Thorsten Quaeschning, and introduces a guest electric violinist. The short story which the album is based upon, "The Island of the Fay", will be included in the album's liner notes.
 Trevor Tanner, via Emperor Penguin Recordings, released an Apple iTunes, Digital 45, entitled "The Ballad Of Edgar Allan Poe" on July 13, 2011.
 Stevie Nicks recorded Annabel Lee on her 2011 album In Your Dreams. Music by Stevie Nicks and Waddy Wachtel.
 Los Angeles band, Edgar Allan Poets, is creating rock music inspired by Edgar Allan Poe and Alfred Hitchcock. The Band wrote in 2012 the song "Crow Girl" inspired by "The Tell Tale Heart".
The 2019 album "Phantoms", from Canadian pop rock band Marianas Trench, contains multiple references to Poe's work throughout, including "Eleonora", referencing Poe's short story of the same title, and "Echoes of You", referencing "The Tell-Tale Heart".
The Starcrawler track ""Bet My Brains", off their 2019 album Devour You, was inspired by Poe's short story "Never Bet the Devil Your Head".

Metal
 Iron Maiden recorded a song titled "Murders in the Rue Morgue" for their second album, 1981's Killers.
 The thrash metal band Annihilator dedicated one song to Poe's short tale "Ligeia" in their debut album Alice in Hell (1989)
 Tool featured the lyrics "seems like I'm slipping into a dream within a dream" in the song "Sweat" on their 1992 album Opiate.
 Avant-garde metal band Arcturus have a song on the album La Masquerade Infernale (1997) called "Alone" incorporating the full, unaltered text of Poe's poem "Alone". 
 The band Odes Of Ecstasy on their second album Deceitful Melody (2000) incorporates the full text of "The Conqueror Worm" under the title of "Abstract Thoughts."
 Grave Digger's 2001 album The Grave Digger is dedicated to Poe, and some of Poe's works, including "The Raven" and "Fall of the House of Usher" are the basis of a number of songs.
 Gothic metal band Tristania have a song called "My Lost Lenore." The song refers to "her raven eyes" and ends similarly to the poem "The Raven", still mourning his lost Lenore.
 The song "The Poet and the Pendulum" by Finnish symphonic metal band Nightwish is partly inspired by Poe's short story "The Pit and the Pendulum." Poe is one of the favorite writers of the band's leader, Tuomas Holopainen.
 Michael Romeo from Symphony X recorded an instrumental album called The Dark Chapter where has several songs inspired from Edgar Allan Poe including "The Cask of Amontillado", "The Premature Burial", and "The Masque of the Red Death". Symphony X would later include a reference to Poe's A Dream Within A Dream in the song "Through the Looking Glass" from the album Twilight in Olympus. Also the song "King of Terrors" from the album The Odyssey is based on and features quotes from Poe's story The Pit and the Pendulum.
 The Christian heavy metal band Tourniquet wrote their song "Tell-Tale Heart"  entirely as a tribute to Poe and have said that his works have inspired them throughout their tenure. The band also used a line from the story, "The Masque of the Red Death" in their song "Vanishing Lessons", from the album of the same title.
 German Ambient Doomrock band The Ocean used "The City in the Sea" as lyrics, only swapping a few lines to fit rhythmical patterns of the song. It was used both due to the band's love of Poe, and the themes common to both poem and band.
 The American death metal band Conducting from the Grave  based the lyrics to its song "Nevermore" off of Poe's poem "The Raven".
 The song "From Childhood's Hour" from Norwegian progressive metal band Circus Maximus is based on Poe's poem "Alone". Most parts of the lyrics are nearly identical to the poem itself.
 German funeral doom metal band Ahab has set Poe's poem "Evening Star" to music. It is present in the deluxe re-release of their 2012 album The Giant.
The 2019 album "The Heretics", from Greek black metal band Rotting Christ, contains song named "The Raven" which quotes verses from Edgar Allan Poe's poem "The Raven".
 Several heavy metal bands have made reference to Poe in their recordings. Progressive/thrash metal band Nevermore takes its name from "The Raven". Other metal bands that have written songs inspired by Poe are: Agathodaimon, Annihilator, Crimson Glory, Ra's Dawn, Manilla Road, Donor, Hawaii, Rage, Metal Church, Stormwitch and Turbo.

Rap and Hip-Hop
 MC Lars heavily refers to "The Raven" in his song "Mr. Raven" on his album The Laptop EP (2004). The song includes the words, "We got EAP in the house tonight, Edgar Allan Poe. America's favorite anti-transcendentalist." He continues to refer to "The Raven" throughout.
 Edgar Allan Poe was pitted against Stephen King in 2013 in Epic Rap Battles of History's Season 3 episode "Stephen King vs Edgar Allan Poe."

Musicals and scores
In the West End musical, Snoopy!!! The Musical, a musical number in act one is titled "Edgar Allan Poe". In the song, some characters are worried that their teacher is  going to ask them something about Edgar Allan Poe, who they know nothing about, while other characters list facts and titles by Poe.

Spoken word
 Jim Reeves recorded "Annabel Lee" in 1963 for an album of poems called Talkin' To Your Heart.
 The tribute album Closed on Account of Rabies produced by Hal Willner was released in 1997, with musicians and actors such as Jeff Buckley and Christopher Walken reading Poe's works with background music.
 Lou Reed released a double CD concept album called The Raven in 2003 that featured a number of musical and spoken-word interpretations of Poe, with guest appearances from various actors, including Steve Buscemi and Willem Dafoe.

Other genres
  Noël Coward's parody version (Las Vegas, 1955) of Cole Porter's "Let's Do It, Let's Fall in Love" (1928) includes the lines: “E. Allan Poe, ho ho ho, did it / But he did it in verse / H. Beecher Stowe did it / But she had to rehearse”.
Buddy Morrow and His Orchestra recorded an album of songs based on Poe's work.  The album, Poe for Moderns, was recorded by the jazz ensemble at Webster Hall in New York in 1960 and includes the following tracks: "The Murders In The Rue Morgue", "Annabel Lee", "The Gold Bug", "A Descent Into The Maelstrom", "The Bells", "The Fall Of The House Of Usher", "The Pit And The Pendulum", "Ulalume", "The Black Cat", "The Raven", and "Quoth The Raven/The Tell-Tale Heart."
 In 1972, Israeli singer Shlomo Artzi recorded his own setting of the famous Hebrew translation, by Ze'ev (Vladimir) Jabotinsky, of "Annabel Lee". This extraordinary translation manages to mimic the internal rhythms and complex rhyming patterns of the original English poem, and, together with Ze'ev Jabotinsky's Russian translation of "Annabel Lee", sets a very high bar in sensitive translations of poetry. This setting was released in an album "Songs of Ze'ev Jabotinsky", or, in Hebrew, משירי זאב ז"בוטינסקי (Mi'shirei Ze'ev Jabotinsky).
 In 1984, the group Propaganda  recited the poem A Dream Within A Dream as the designated lyrics for a song by the same name.
 The song "Allan" by French singer Mylène Farmer from her album Ainsi Soit Je... (1988) is dedicated to Edgar Allan Poe.
 Cuban musician Silvio Rodríguez has several songs on Poe, including "Trova de Edgardo" (1992), on the album Silvio.
 Nox Arcana, an American gothic instrumental duo, pays homage to all of Poe's literary works with their 2007 album Shadow of the Raven.
 The neocelt band Omnia has set "The Raven" to music on their 2007 CD Alive!.
 The steampunk band Abney Park refer briefly to Poe in "The Secret Life of Dr. Calgori" on their 2008 album Lost Horizons.
 Voltaire's song "Graveyard Picnic" is dedicated to Poe, and includes in the lyrics references to Poe's works, such as The Conqueror Worm, Lenore, Annabel Lee, and The Tell-Tale Heart, as well as mentioning Poe by name. He would also set Poe's poem "The Conqueror Worm" to music in his 2014 album Raised by Bats.
Greek-Cypriot songwriter and singer Alkinoos Ioannidis has written a song entitled "Edgar Allan Poe", recorded in the album O Dromos, O Hronos Kai O Ponos.
Creature Feature's first album "The Greatest Show Unearthed", features the song "Buried Alive", which is full of references to Poe's works.
 Other bands or musicians that have recorded songs inspired by Poe or using lyrics by Poe include Bright Eyes, Green Carnation (in the song "Alone"), Good Charlotte, Mr. Bungle, The Crüxshadows, Roses Never Fade, Cradle of Filth, Team Sleep, Elysian Fields, The Smithereens, Symphony X, Rozz Williams, Siouxsie and the Banshees, Tiger Army, Sopor Aeternus & The Ensemble of Shadows, Overlord, Insane Clown Posse, Antony and the Johnsons, Marissa Nadler, Lloyd Cole, Panic! at the Disco, Michael Hurley, AFI, and Dredg.

See also

For his influence on other media:
Edgar Allan Poe in television and film

For his appearances as a fictional character:
Edgar Allan Poe in popular culture

References

External links
American Symphony Orchestra: "Tales of Edgar Allan Poe"
Music with Poe Themes @ HouseOfUsher.net
Ballet with Poe Themes

Music
Romanticism
Musical culture
Music